Club Deportivo Benicarló, commonly referred to as Benicarló, is a Spanish football team based in Benicarló in the autonomous Valencian Community. Founded in 1921, it plays in Regional Preferente – Group 2, holding home games at Estadio Ángel "Pichi" Alonso, with a capacity of 2,000 people.

History
Founded in 1921, Benicarló first reached the Tercera División in 1965, and played five consecutive seasons in the category before suffering relegation. After fluctuating between Tercera and the Regional Preferente, the club suffered relegation to the Primera Regional in 2010.

In 2012, Benicarló merged with neighbouring CF Sporting Benicarló, regaining their Preferente place. They returned to Tercera División after 29 years in 2020, but immediately suffered relegation.

Season to season

16 seasons in Tercera División

Notable players
 Juan Ignacio Martínez

References

External links
  
 BDFutbol team profile

1921 establishments in Spain
Association football clubs established in 1921
Football clubs in the Valencian Community
Province of Valencia